To a Stranger is the debut studio album by Australian musician Odette, released on 6 July 2018. The album peaked at number 13 on the ARIA Charts.

At the ARIA Music Awards of 2018, the album was nominated for Best Adult Contemporary Album and Breakthrough Artist.

Track listing

Charts

Release history

References

2018 debut albums
Odette (musician) albums
Albums produced by Damian Taylor